Yellow is a Bangladesh-based fashion brand and clothing retailer owned by Beximco. Its corporate headquarters is located at Beximco Industrial Park, Dhaka, Bangladesh. The largest of the Yellow stores are located in Bashundhara City Shopping Complex, Sanmar Ocean City Chittagong and Jamuna Future Park. There are several stores located in Pakistan. In 2014, Beximco announced the opening of new outlets in Dubai, Toronto, and New York City.

Sponsorship in sports
 Dhaka Dynamites

Beximco Luxury Lawn
Beximco Luxury Lawn was launched in 2014 by Beximco, dedicated only to Women's clothing. Dubai will be the first overseas outlet to get the clothing line.

Expansion
In 2014, Beximco announced the opening of 102 Outlets in Bangladesh and several in Dubai, New York City and Toronto in early 2015 and Seoul in mid 2015.

References

External links
 Official Website

BEXIMCO group
Companies based in Dhaka
Retail companies established in 2004
Clothing brands of Bangladesh
Clothing companies of Bangladesh
Bangladeshi companies established in 2004